Ants on a log is a snack made by spreading peanut butter, cream cheese, ricotta cheese, or another spread on celery, pretzels or bananas and placing raisins (diced olives, chocolate chips, etc.) on top. The snack and its name are presumed to be from the 1950s. The classic peanut butter version of ants on a log is recommended as a healthy snack by the McKinley Health Center at the University of Illinois at Urbana-Champaign. The fun name and simple flavors appeal to children.

Origins 
Stuffed celery became a popular snack in the early 1900s after the inclusion of such recipes as Celery with Roquefort in the book Catering for Special Occasions with Menus and Recipes by Fannie Merritt Farmer. Celery was most commonly stuffed with a form of cheese, most popular being cream cheese, and was often topped with capers or olives. The inventor of the peanut butter/raisin combination of the snack is unknown. However, many attribute the popularization of the combination to the Girl Scouts, where the recipe has been featured in several iterations of the Girl Scout Cookbook as far back as 1946, although at that time the recipe was titled "Celery Sticks" and did not include raisins. The first time the "Ants on a Log" snack was mentioned in print was in an article published by the Star Tribune on February 15, 1959, which reads, "Anne Marie is working on snacks. Popcorn, cheese dips, and the other night, ants on a log have been some of the foods the family has shared.”

Variants
There are numerous variations of ants on a log, including:

 Gnats on a log: currants
 Ants on vacation: without "ants" (raisins)
 Ants on a Slip 'n Slide: add honey on top of the peanut butter before adding raisins
 Hippopotamuses on Thomases: Half English muffin with peanut butter and prunes.

In popular media 

 In episode The Manager and the Salesman of The Office season 6, Erin reveals that Michael has her bring ants on a log at 2.30pm every day.
 In episode Wilson Furlbee of series One Dollar season 1, Terri Mitchell’s friend offers ants on a log to the kids.

See also
 List of peanut dishes
 List of vegetable dishes

References

American snack foods
Food for children